L Ramachandran (born November 11, 1979) is an internationally known photographer and artist. He worked for magazines such as Playboy & Maxim and authored five photography books. L Ramachandran received an honorable doctorate degree from The International Tamil University USA. In 2019, he made a Guinness World record with his team for the most faces painted in four hours.

Early life
L Ramchandran was born on November 11, 1979 in Valangaiman, a small town in the Valangaimantaluk of Thiruvarur district in the Indian state of Tamil Nadu. He joined Fine Arts College of Kumbakonam, however he was not able to complete his studies due to his poor financial condition.

Career
L Ramachandran started his career as an assistant painter and created banners for products and films. He moved to Chennai and got an opportunity to work in the medicine. He found an opportunity to work in a film company to design logos and promotional content. He discovered his interest in photography and started to teach himself the trade. L Ramachandran started his own advertisement agency, Tharansia.

L Ramachandran did shoots for celebrities and national brands. He attended a seminar in Miami and was selected to participate for Playboy magazine. He met Jarmo Pohjaniemi who was the CEO for Shoot the Centrefold. Jarmo Pohjaniemi got impressed by the photography skills of L Ramachandran and taught him advanced photography. After several rounds, the institute announced L Ramachandran as the first Indian Playboy magazine photographer. After that he worked with many playmates and international photographers. His work was published in Playboy and other magazines.

Exhibitions

Books
Medley of Art
Queen of Fantasy
Apsaras
Ethereal of light
Choreographing the chiaroscuro
Chennai To Madras

Awards
IPA – International photography award – 2011 Los Angeles
Photographer's forum magazine – 2011 United States
STC best student award – 2012 United States
STC best student award – 2013 Santorini
TEA award – 2013 India
STC beat lighting (Hensel) – 2014 Miami
HP award – 2016
B&W spider award – 2016 
ATIM's Top 60 Masters’ contemporary artist award – 2017
B&W Spider Award – 2017  
 PX3 Award – 2017
TIFA Award – 2017 Silver winner
Honourable Doctorate from International Tamil University – 2018
Honourable Doctorate from St.Andrews Theological University – 2019
Behind the Success of Transgender Special Award - 2019
London Photography Awards (Poetry in Motions - People Photography) - 2022

References

Living people
Playboy photographers
1980 births